Černá is a municipality and village in Žďár nad Sázavou District in the Vysočina Region of the Czech Republic. It has about 300 inhabitants.

Administrative parts
The village of Milíkov is an administrative part of Černá.

Geography
It lies in the Křižanov Highlands. The Křivý brook flows through the municipality. The territory is rich in small fish ponds.

History

The first written mention of Černá is from 1464. In 1556, the village was bought by Vratislav II of Pernštejn. From 1559, it was owned by the Chroustenský family. Jan Rafael Chroustenský had built a Renaissance castle at the end of the 16th century. After the Battle of White Mountain, the properties of the Chroustenský family were confiscated, and in 1624 Černá was handed over to the Collalto family. They owned the estate until 1918, when the property was confiscated by the government.

Sights
The castle underwent a Baroque reconstruction in the 18th century, but it mainly concerned interiors and the Renaissance character of the castle was preserved. After 1948 the castle was owned by the municipality, and social and cultural events were held there. At the beginning of the 1990s the building was sold to the new owner. Today the castle is privately owned and inaccessible to the public.

References

External links

Villages in Žďár nad Sázavou District